Rocca Bernauda (French: Roche Bernaude) is a mountain of the Alps of . It has been the westernmost point of Italy since the cession of Valle Stretta (Vallée Étroite) at the Paris Peace Treaties of 1947.

It is in the Cottian Alps close to Bardonecchia between the Susa Valley, Durance and Maurienne Valley With the Arc River. Geologically, it has quartzites and gneiss, especially at the peak.

References

Mountains of the Alps
Mountains of Piedmont
Alpine three-thousanders
France–Italy border
International mountains of Europe
Mountains of Hautes-Alpes